The 2022 Pereira Challenger was a professional tennis tournament played on clay courts. It was the first edition of the tournament which was part of the 2022 ATP Challenger Tour. It took place in Pereira, Colombia between 28 March and 4 April 2022.

Singles main-draw entrants

Seeds

 1 Rankings are as of 21 March 2022.

Other entrants
The following players received wildcards into the singles main draw:
  Nicolás Barrientos
  Mateo Gómez
  Alejandro González

The following player received entry into the singles main draw as a special exempt:
  Paul Jubb

The following players received entry into the singles main draw as alternates:
  Daniel Dutra da Silva
  Peđa Krstin

The following players received entry from the qualifying draw:
  Elmar Ejupovic
  Juan Sebastián Gómez
  Facundo Juárez
  Yshai Oliel
  Oleg Prihodko
  Roberto Quiroz

The following player received entry as a lucky loser:
  Juan Bautista Torres

Champions

Singles

 Facundo Bagnis def.  Facundo Mena 6–3, 6–0.

Doubles

 Luis David Martínez /  Cristian Rodríguez def.  Grigoriy Lomakin /  Oleg Prihodko 7–6(7–2), 7–6(7–3).

References

2022 ATP Challenger Tour
2022 in Colombian tennis
March 2022 sports events in South America
April 2022 sports events in South America